Barry M. Malkin (October 26, 1938 – April 4, 2019) was an American film editor with about 30 film credits. He is noted for his extended collaboration with director Francis Ford Coppola, having edited most of Coppola's films from 1969 to 1997. In particular, Malkin worked with Coppola on four of the component and compilation films of the Godfather trilogy, though he did not edit the first film, The Godfather. Film critic Roger Ebert called the first two Godfather films  a "cultural bedrock".

Early career
Malkin worked as an apprentice to editor Dede Allen on the film America America (directed by Elia Kazan-1962), and became acquainted with editor Aram Avakian, who was an occasional visitor. Malkin became Avakian's assistant editor on Lilith (directed by Robert Rossen-1964). Malkin got his first credits as a full editor on The Patty Duke Show (TV) and on the "Z movie" The Fat Spy (1966). Francis Ford Coppola heard of Malkin from Avakian, who had edited Coppola's film You're a Big Boy Now (1966); it turned out that Malkin and Coppola had been acquainted as teenagers growing up in the same Queens neighborhood. Coppola engaged Malkin to edit his fourth film as director, The Rain People (1969). He worked as an associate editor on two additional films edited by Robert Q. Lovett: End of the Road (directed by Aram Avakian-1970), and Cotton Comes to Harlem (directed by Ossie Davis-1970). Malkin was the editor for the 1973 film directed by Avakian, Cops and Robbers.

The Godfather and the 1970s
The Godfather was extremely successful artistically and at the box office; among other distinctions, it won the Academy Award for Best Picture for 1972. Production of a sequel, The Godfather Part II, started in 1973. William Reynolds and Peter Zinner had edited The Godfather, and been nominated for the Academy Award for Best Film Editing for their work. For the sequel, Malkin and Richard Marks joined Zinner as co-editors. Godfather Part II, which was released in 1974 and enjoyed success comparable to The Godfather, is noted for its intercutting between two storylines, one from Sicily in the early 20th century, and a second contemporary story that follows the first film's action. Long afterwards, the film was listed as the 22nd best-edited film of all time in a 2012 survey of members of the Motion Picture Editors Guild.

Coppola subsequently asked Malkin to edit The Godfather Saga (1977), a television miniseries, that was based on the two films. The miniseries incorporated scenes that could not be included in the original versions, and replaced the complex intercutting between time periods of the original films with a more straightforward chronological ordering.

Malkin was an additional editor for Apocalypse Now (1979), and a supervising editor for the Coppola-produced film Hammett (directed by Wim Wenders, 1982). In this period, Malkin also edited Four Friends (1981), which was directed by Arthur Penn. Dede Allen had edited Penn's films since Bonnie and Clyde (1967), but was unavailable for this film. Stephen Prince has written of the contrast between them: "the difference an editor makes on a director's films is evident by comparing his more linear approach to Dede Allen's fractured and off-center cutting".

1980s and 1990s
During the 1980s Malkin edited six of Coppola's films, from Rumble Fish (1983) through The Godfather Part III (1990). He was joined by his former mentor Robert Q. Lovett for The Cotton Club (1984), which garnered the two editors a nomination for the Academy Award. Malkin also edited the film Big (1988) that was directed by Penny Marshall. By the end of the decade Coppola had agreed to make The Godfather Part III (1990), and brought in Malkin, Lisa Fruchtman, and Walter Murch to edit. Malkin and Murch then edited a compilation entitled The Godfather Trilogy: 1901–1980 that was released to video in 1992. The compilation included footage from the theatrically released versions of all three films as well as additional footage. A 1993 review in Time reads, "This trilogy has a novelistic density, a rueful, unhurried lyricism and a depth that, singly, the films could not achieve. Altogether glorious."

In the 1990s, in addition to his work with Coppola on Jack (1996) and The Rainmaker (1997), Malkin edited four films with director Andrew Bergman. Their first film together, The Freshman (1992), is to some extent a comic "sendup" of the original 1972 Godfather film, including a part played by Marlon Brando. Malkin's last credit was for The Big Bounce (2004), which was directed by George Armitage.

Awards
Malkin, Marks, and Zinner were nominated for the BAFTA Award for Best Editing for The Godfather: Part II (1974). The film was listed as the 22nd best-edited film of all time in a 2012 survey of members of the Motion Picture Editors Guild. He and Robert Q. Lovett were nominated for the Academy Award for Best Film Editing for The Cotton Club (directed by Francis Ford Coppola-1984). Malkin, Murch, and Fruchtman were nominated for the Academy Award for editing The Godfather Part III (1990). Malkin was selected for membership in the American Cinema Editors.

Filmography (as editor)
The director for each film is indicated in parenthesis. Filmography based on Oldham's book and the Internet Movie Database.

References

American film editors
American Cinema Editors
1938 births
2019 deaths
20th-century American Jews
Place of birth missing
21st-century American Jews